Mervat Mostafa Amin (born November 24, 1948) is an Egyptian actress.

Early life
She was born in El Minya to Mohammed Mostafa Amin, a doctor from Upper Egypt, and a Scottish mother, the headmaster of Victoria College elementary school. She was raised in Heliopolis and has a bachelor's degree in English Literature from Ain Shams University.

Career
Amin's film debut in Egyptian cinema was in Nfus Ha'irah (1968) with Ahmed Mazhar (1917-2002), followed by her role with Salah Zulfikar (1926-1993) in Thalath Nesaa (1968) and her fame came when she took her first leading role in with Abdel Halim Hafez (1929-1977) in his last film, Abi foq al-Shagara (1969).

From there she became one of the most successful Egyptian actresses in the 1970s and early 1980s during which she starred in many Egyptian films.

Personal life
Mervat Amin was married five times. She was briefly married to Egyptian guitarist Omar Khorshid, and, following a divorce, was married to the famous Egyptian actor Hussein Fahmy from 1974 to 1986, when the marriage ended in divorce. They had a daughter named Menna.

Filmography

Film

Television

References

External links

1948 births
Egyptian film actresses
Egyptian artists
Egyptian people of Scottish descent
Living people
Egyptian actresses
Egyptian Muslims